Centuries of Torment: The First 20 Years is a three-disc documentary DVD by Cannibal Corpse, released in 2008. It contains a three-hour documentary on the history of the band and several concert performances as extra features. It was released on July 8 in USA and July 14 in Europe. This DVD has also been certified platinum in Canada.

Disc one

Cannibal Corpse history

1987–1995
Intro
Demo
Eaten Back to Life
Butchered at Birth
Tomb of the Mutilated
The Bleeding

1996–2007
Vile
Gallery of Suicide
Bloodthirst
Gore Obsessed
The Wretched Spawn
Kill

Disc two

Cannibal Corpse performances

With Full Force 2007 (Löbnitz, Germany)
"Unleashing the Bloodthirsty"
"Murder Worship"
"Disposal of the Body"

Toronto 2006
"The Time to Kill Is Now"
"Disfigured"
"Death Walking Terror"
"Covered With Sores"
"Born in a Casket"
"I Cum Blood"
"Decency Defied"
"Make Them Suffer"
"Dormant Bodies Bursting"
"Five Nails Through the Neck"
"Devoured by Vermin"
"Hammer Smashed Face"
"Stripped, Raped and Strangled"

Party San 2005
"Puncture Wound Massacre"
"Sentenced to Burn"
"Fucked With a Knife"
"Psychotic Precision"
"Pulverized"
"Pounded into Dust"
"The Wretched Spawn"

New York 2000
"The Spine Splitter"
"Dead Human Collection"

Jacksonville 1996
"Mummified in Barbed Wire"

Nashville 1994
"Entrails Ripped from a Virgin's Cunt"
"Pulverized"

Buffalo 1989
"Shredded Humans"
"Rotting Head"

Music videos
"Staring Through the Eyes of the Dead"
"Devoured by Vermin"
"Sentenced to Burn"
"Decency Defied"
"Death Walking Terror"
"Make Them Suffer"
"Stripped, Raped and Strangled" 2007 (with Trevor Strnad of The Black Dahlia Murder)

Disc three

Bonus chunks 
Compelled to Illustrate
Every Ban Broken
Covered with Ink
Maniacal Merch
Relentless Touring
Word Infested
Sickening Metalocalypse
Diverse Offerings
Staring Through the Eyes of the Band
Kill Crane

Band line up
Current members
George "Corpsegrinder" Fisher – vocals (1995–present)
Pat O'Brien – lead guitar (1997–present)
Rob Barrett – lead guitar (1993–1997); rhythm guitar (2005–present)
Alex Webster – bass (1988–present)
Paul Mazurkiewicz – drums (1988–present)

Past members
Chris Barnes – vocals (1988–1995)
Bob Rusay – lead guitar (1988–1993)
Jack Owen – rhythm guitar (1988–2004)
Jeremy Turner – rhythm guitar (2004–2005)

Specifications
Studio: Metal Blade
Aspect ratio: 4:3 Fullscreen
Format: Best of, Box set, Color, DVD-Video, NTSC
Audio language: English

References

External links
Official Cannibal Corpse website
DVD Teaser
Exclusive Clip: Starting the band
Exclusive Clip: Getting signed to Metal Blade
Exclusive Clip: Eaten Back To Life and lyrics
Exclusive Clip: First American tour
Exclusive Clip: First European tour
Exclusive Clip: Vocals and lyrics
Exclusive Clip: About playing live
Exclusive Clip: About George Fisher
Exclusive Clip: Making Kill

Cannibal Corpse video albums
2008 video albums
2008 live albums
Live video albums
Documentary films about heavy metal music and musicians
Metal Blade Records live albums
Metal Blade Records video albums